Antozola is a genus of moths in the family Geometridae. It was described by Claude Herbulot in 1992.

References

Desmobathrinae
Geometridae genera
Taxa named by Claude Herbulot